The Roman Catholic Archdiocese of Bulawayo is the Metropolitan See for the Ecclesiastical province of Bulawayo in Zimbabwe.

History
 January 4, 1931: Established as Mission “sui iuris” of Bulawayo from the Apostolic Prefecture of Salisbury 
 July 18, 1932: Promoted as Apostolic Prefecture of Bulawayo
 April 13, 1937: Promoted as Apostolic Vicariate of Bulawayo
 January 1, 1955: Promoted as Diocese of Bulawayo
 June 10, 1994: Promoted as Metropolitan Archdiocese of Bulawayo

Cathedral
The seat of the archbishop is the Cathedral of the Immaculate Conception in Bulawayo.

Leadership

Prefect of Bulawayo 
 Giovanni Matteo Konings, OSCr (1926 – 1929)

Ecclesiastical Superior of Bulawayo 
 Ignatius Arnoz, CMM (27 April 1931 – 18 June 1932 see below)

Prefect Apostolic of Bulawayo 
 Ignatius Arnoz, CMM (see above 18 June 1932 – 13 April 1937 see below)

Vicars Apostolic of Bulawayo 
 Ignazio Arnoz, CMM (see above 13 April 1937 – 26 February 1950)
 Adolph Gregory Schmitt, CMM (23 December 1950 – 1 January 1955 see below)

Bishops of Bulawayo 
 Adolph Gregory Schmitt, CMM (see above 1 January 1955 – 9 May 1974 )
 Ernst Heinrich Karlen, CMM (9 May 1974 – 10 June 1994 see below)

Archbishops of Bulawayo 
 Ernst Heinrich Karlen, CMM (see above 10 June 1994 – 24 October 1997)
 Pius Ncube (24 October 1997 – 11 September 2007)
 Apostolic administrator: Martin Schupp, CMM (11 September 2007 – 20 June 2009)
 Alex Kaliyanil, SVD (20 June 2009 – )

Suffragan dioceses 
 Diocese of Gweru
 Diocese of Hwange
 Diocese of Masvingo

See also
Roman Catholicism in Zimbabwe
List of Roman Catholic dioceses in Zimbabwe

External links
Official website

Sources
 GCatholic.org

Bulawayo
A